Die toten Augen (The Dead Eyes) is an opera (called a  or 'stage poem' by the composer) with a prologue and one act by Eugen d'Albert to a libretto in German by Hanns Heinz Ewers and  (Achille Georges d'Ailly-Vaucheret) after Henry's own 1897 play Les yeux morts.

Performance history
Die toten Augen was first performed on 5 March 1916 at the Hofoper in Dresden conducted by Fritz Reiner. During the opening run of seven performances (March–May 1916), the role of Aurelius Galba was sung on two occasions, and that of Der Hirt on four occasions, by Richard Tauber.

Roles

Synopsis
Set in biblical times, Die toten Augen is a tragic drama involving a Roman envoy called Arcesius, his beautiful but blind wife Myrtocle and Aurelius Galba, a handsome Roman captain.

A review by Michael Oliver in Gramophone enlarges upon this:
The plot, set in Jerusalem on the first Palm Sunday, concerns the beautiful Myrtocle, blind since birth, who longs for sight mainly so that she may see her deeply loved husband Arcesius, whom she believes to be as handsome as Apollo. She is given her sight by Christ who (his single, off-stage line) predicts that before the sun sets she will curse him. A man as handsome as Apollo indeed appears, and Myrtocle falls into his arms: it is Galba, her husband's friend, who has loved her for years. Arcesius kills him and Myrtocle, realising his love and his suffering, blinds herself again by staring at the sun. The action is framed by a Prologue and Epilogue in which a Shepherd goes in search of a lost lamb and, in the Epilogue, finds it.

Recordings
1997: Dagmar Schellenberger, Hartmut Welker, Olaf Bär; Dresden Philharmonic, Dresden Philharmonic Choir, conductor: Ralf Weikert; March 1997, CPO - B000042OED (CD)
There is another recording, deriving from a 1951 Stuttgart radio production, on Cantus Classics CACD 5.00231 F. It is conducted by Walter Born, and the main singers are Marianne Schech, Wolfgang Windgassen, Franz Fehringer and Hetty Plümacher.

References

Further reading
Forbes, Elizabeth (1992), "Toten Augen, Die" in The New Grove Dictionary of Opera, ed. Stanley Sadie (London)

External links
 Work details, Boosey & Hawkes

Operas by Eugen d'Albert
1916 operas
Operas set in the 1st century
Operas set in the Levant
German-language operas
Operas
One-act operas
Operas based on plays